Phitsanulok railway station is a railway station in Phitsanulok and it is the main station for the province. It is owned by the State Railway of Thailand and is on the Northern Line. Formerly, the Nakhon Phing Express did not stop at this station and proceeded straight to Sila At Station in Uttaradit. In 2012, the express began stopping at this station. This is the last station that uses lighted signal posts and marks the start of the section with the use of semaphore signals.

Train services
 Local Diesel Car 407/408 Nakhon Sawan-Chiang Mai-Nakhon Sawan
 Local Diesel Car 403/404 Phitsanulok-Sila At-Phitsanulok
 Local Diesel Car 401/402 Lop Buri-Phitsanulok-Lop Buri
 Rapid 111/108 Bangkok-Den Chai-Bangkok
 Special Express "Utthawithi" 9/10 Bangkok-Chiang Mai-Bangkok
 Ordinary 201/202 Bangkok-Phitsanulok-Bangkok
 Special Express Diesel Car 3/4 Bangkok-Sawankhalok/Sila At-Bangkok
 Rapid 109/102 Bangkok-Chiang Mai-Bangkok
 Special Express 13/14 Bangkok-Chiang Mai-Bangkok
 Rapid Diesel Car 105/106 Bangkok-Sila At-Bangkok
 Rapid 107/112 Bangkok-Den Chai-Bangkok
 Express 51/52 Bangkok-Chiang Mai-Bangkok
 Special Express Diesel Car 7/8 Bangkok-Chiang Mai-Bangkok

Future
Phitsanulok is planned stop on the high-speed rail link connecting Bangkok to Chiang Mai. The station location has not been decided. There are two choices: at the current railway station or another site near Phitsanulok Airport.

References
 
 

Railway stations in Thailand